P. T. may refer to:

People
 P. T. Barnum (1810-1891), American showman, politician and businessman
 P. T. Bopanna (born 1950), Indian author and journalist
 P. T. Chacko (1915-1964), Indian politician
 P. T. Chandapilla (1926-2010), Vicar General of St. Thomas Evangelical Church of India
 P. T. Daly (1870-1943), Irish trade unionist and politician
 P. T. De Silva (1929-2015), Sri Lankan physician
 P. T. Deutermann (born 1941), American writer of mystery, police procedural and thriller novels
 P. T. Srinivasa Iyengar (1863–1931), Indian historian, linguist and educationist
 P. T. Kunju Muhammed (born 1949), Indian Malayalam film director and producer and politician
 P. T. Parameshwar Naik Indian politician who assumed office in 2013
 P. T. Narasimhan (1928–2013), Indian theoretical chemist
 P. T. Rajan (1892-1974), Indian politician and barrister, Chief Minister of Madras Presidency
 Pakhal Tirumal Reddy (1915-1996), Indian painter
 P. T. Ricci (born 1987), American professional lacrosse player
 P. T. Selbit (1881–1938), English magician, inventor and writer credited with being the first person to perform the illusion of sawing a woman in half
 P. T. Selvakumar, Indian Tamil film director and producer
 P. T. Thanu Pillai, Indian politician active in the 1950s
 P. T. Thomas (born 1950), Indian politician
 P. T. Usha (born 1964), Indian retired sprinter and hurdler

 Paul Tracy (born 1968) Canadian race car Driver; frequently known as "P. T."

Fictional characters
 P. T. Flea, a flea in the 1998 Disney/Pixar animated film A Bug's Life

See also
 PT (disambiguation), for other uses of PT
 Petey (disambiguation)